The Bosanska Jagodina Massacre refers to the execution of 17 Bosniak civilians from Višegrad on 26 May 1992, all of which were men. This war crime was most probably carried out by paramilitary forces "Avengers" led by Milan Lukić, under the control of the Army of Republika Srpska. In 2006 the remains of the murdered men were found in a mass grave in Crnčići near Bosanska Jagodina. According to the Commission for missing persons in Bosnia and Herzegovina the following were executed that day : Bajro Murtić, Ismail Račić, Hidajet Račić, Mirsad Veletovac, Kemal Maluhić, Sead Šuško, Midhat Kasapović, Abdulah Veletovac, Ahmet Kadrić, Esad Tabaković, Bajro Beširević, Mehmed Džagadurov, Hamed Zukić, and one person with the surname Kasapović from the village Žagre near Višegrad.

See also
Višegrad massacre
Uzamnica camp
Paklenik Massacre
Srebrenica massacre
Bosnian genocide
Višegrad
Željko Lelek
Momir Savić
Milan Lukić
Mitar Vasiljević
Nenad Tanasković

References

1992 in Bosnia and Herzegovina
Massacres in the Bosnian War
Massacres of men
Massacres in 1992
May 1992 events in Europe
Violence against men in Europe
Massacres of Bosniaks